Duke of Sessa is a Spanish noble title awarded to Gonzalo Fernández de Córdoba by Ferdinand II in 1507.
It was the fifth ducal title bestowed on Gonzalo, after the ducal titles of Santángelo (1497), Terranova (1502), Andría (1507) and Montalto (1507).

Its territorial designation refers to Sessa Aurunca, at the time in the Kingdom of Naples.
The title is one of the numerous duchies created by the Catholic Monarchs and never represented any territorial claim.

With the loss of the Kingdom of Naples in 1806, the designation has ceased to be located in Spanish-controlled territory. The 15th duke, Vicente Pío Osorio de Moscoso y Ponce de León (1801–1864), held a total of 109 titles of nobility, among them fourteen ducal titles, and is known as the most titled individual in the history of Spain.

Like all Spanish titles, it used to descend according to male-preference cognatic primogeniture. Therefore, it was held by several women (i.e. the 2nd, 4th, 11th and 19th holders of the title). 
The surname of Fernández de Córdoba was retained by the 3rd duke and his sister, the 4th duchess, due being the offspring of a cousin marriage.
The 5th duke, Antonio Fernández de Córdoba y Cardona was the son of  Beatriz de Figueroa, a daughter of the second duchess, Elvira Fernández de Córdoba y Manrique.

Beatriz de Figueroa would regularly have had the surname Fernández de Córdoba, but she preferred de Figueroa in honour of her maternal grandmother, but her son as the 5th duke nevertheless continued the regular surname of Fernández de Córdoba. The 12th duke had the surname Osorio de Moscoso from his father, Ventura Osorio de Moscoso y Guzmán Dávila y Aragón (1707–1734 himself the 6th duke of Sanlúcar la Mayor), and the 20th and 21st dukes (since 1955) have the surname Barón, after Leopoldo Barón y Torres  (1890–1952), the 21st duke of Maqueda.

References

Juan Miguel Soler Salcedo, Nobleza española, Editorial Visión Libros (2008),  p. 103,  p. 142, p. 183, note cxxxviii (p. 512).

See also
List of dukes in the peerage of Spain
Grandee of Spain

 
Dukedoms of Spain
Lists of dukes